"Stach Stach" is a 2002 song recorded by Michael Youn and his band Bratisla Boys. This humoristic song was released as first single from the album Anthologigi, in April 2002. Entirely composed of onomatopoeics and meaningless words on a repetitive music, the song became a hit, topping the chart in France for almost four months.

Song information
The song was first performed as a parody of the Eurovision contest in the French TV show Morning Live, hosted by Michaël Youn and his two friends and broadcast on M6. As it was well received by the public, it was recorded and eventually released as a single, and was sponsored by Fun Radio.

In a funny way, the song is supposed to having been recorded in a submarine while it was at 300 metres of deep. Dvorjak, Olaff and Piotr, who are indicated as writers and composers of the song, are actually the singers under a pseudonym. All three appear bare buttocks on the back of the single cover.

In France, the single was charted for 38 weeks on the chart (top 100) from 20 April 2002. It spent ten weeks atop, 21 weeks in the top ten and 31 weeks in the top 50. Certified Diamond, the song is the eighth best-selling single of the 21st century in France, with 797,000 units sold.

Track listings
 CD single
 "Stach Stach" (edit long) — 3:14
 "Stach Stach" (edit radio) — 1:24
 "Stach Stach" (instrumental) — 3:14
 "Bratisla Theme" — 3:38

 12" maxi
 "Stach Stach" (edit long) — 3:14
 "Stach Stach" (edit radio) — 1:24
 "Stach Stach" (instrumental) — 3:14
 "Bratisla Theme" — 3:38

 CD single - Promo
 "Stach Stach" (edit long) — 3:14
 "Stach Stach" (edit radio 1) — 1:45
 "Bratisla anthem" — 3:38

Credits
 Written by Dvorjak, Olaff and Piotr
 Artwork by Markus Dinocerak
 Photography by S. Mickaïlof
 "Bratisla anthem" : mixed by Tomislav Arroyovski, produced by Play Mo' Bitch, scratches by Nikolaï

Charts

Peak positions

End of year charts

Certifications

References

2002 singles
Michaël Youn songs
SNEP Top Singles number-one singles
Novelty songs